Armando (Armandinho) dos Santos Silva (June 3, 1911 in São Carlos – May 26, 1972 in Santos) was an association football player who has played for Brazil national team.

References

1911 births
1972 deaths
People from São Carlos
Brazilian footballers
Brazil international footballers
1934 FIFA World Cup players
Associação Atlética Ponte Preta players
Botafogo de Futebol e Regatas players
São Paulo FC players
Associação Portuguesa de Desportos players
Esporte Clube Bahia players
Associação Atlética Portuguesa (Santos) players
Santos FC players
Association football forwards
Footballers from São Paulo (state)